Reunion is a comic based on the television series Buffy the Vampire Slayer and Angel.

Story description
Willow recently called Angel and announced that Buffy was alive. Angel called Buffy and the two agreed to meet at a place between Sunnydale and LA. She revealed little when arriving back at Sunnydale, just as Angel revealed little to his co-workers.

Buffy's friends all consider their own versions of what might have happened between the star-crossed lovers. However as they imagine what might have been, they do so with increasingly dangerous consequences before it is revealed another of Willow's spells has malfunctioned.

Continuity

Canonical issues

Buffy comics such as this one are not usually considered by fans as canonical. Some fans consider them to be stories from the imaginations of authors and artists, while other fans consider them as taking place in an alternative fictional reality. However unlike fan fiction, overviews summarising their story, written early in the writing process, were approved by both Fox and Joss Whedon (or his office), and the books were therefore later published as official Buffy merchandise.

Timing
Supposed to be set early in Buffy season 6 and Angel season 3. After "Flooded" and "Carpe Noctem" but before "Life Serial" and "Fredless".
The reunion between Buffy and Angel took place offscreen from the TV show, as Angel was aired by WB Network, and Buffy by UPN. Since UPN and WB were rivals, full blown crossovers were more difficult during this period.

External links
 Free ecomic of Reunion from the BBC

Comics based on Buffy the Vampire Slayer
One-shot comic titles
Buffyverse comic book crossovers